Christoph Wahrstötter (born 10 October 1989) is an Austrian freestyle skier. He was born in Kitzbühel. He competed in ski cross at the World Ski Championships in 2013 (where he failed to qualify missing out by only 0.17 seconds) and 2017 (where he placed 5th), and at the 2014 Winter Olympics in Sochi, in ski-cross.

References

1989 births
Living people
Freestyle skiers at the 2014 Winter Olympics
Freestyle skiers at the 2018 Winter Olympics
Austrian male freestyle skiers
Olympic freestyle skiers of Austria
People from Kitzbühel
Sportspeople from Tyrol (state)